Farimaneh (also Romanized as Farīmāneh; also known as Farīmān) is a village in Joghatai Rural District, in the Central District of Joghatai County, Razavi Khorasan Province, Iran. At the 2006 census, its population was 1,636, in 395 families.

References 

Populated places in Joghatai County